The Women's Pan American Junior Championship is a women's international under-21 field hockey tournament organized by the Pan American Hockey Federation. The tournament has been held since 1988 and serves as a qualification tournament for the Junior World Cup.

The tournament has been won by three different teams: Argentina has the most titles with seven, the United States and Canada both have won one title. The most recent edition was held in Santiago, Chile and was won by Canada.

Results

Summary

* = host nation

Team appearances

See also
Men's Pan American Junior Championship
Women's Pan American Cup

References

External links
Pan American Hockey Federation

 
Junior Championship
Junior Championship
Pan American Junior Championship